Cirilo Tadeus Cardoso Filho, commonly known as Cirilo (born 20 January 1980), is a former Russian futsal player of Brazilian origin. He was a member of the Russian national futsal team.

Honours

 Russian Futsal Super League champion (7): 2005, 2006, 2007, 2008, 2011, 2012, 2013
 UEFA Futsal Cup winner: 2006–07
 Russian Futsal Cup winner (6): 2004, 2008, 2009, 2010, 2011, 2013
 Russian Futsal Super Cup winner: 2003
 UEFA Futsal Championship third place: 2007
 FIFA Futsal World Cup fourth place: 2008

External links
 AMFR profile
 Dinamo profile

1980 births
Living people
Sportspeople from São Paulo
Brazilian men's futsal players
Russian men's futsal players
Brazilian emigrants to Russia
Naturalised citizens of Russia
MFK Dinamo Moskva players